Rhyd Ddu is a station on the narrow gauge Welsh Highland Railway, which was built in 1881 as the North Wales Narrow Gauge Railways Moel Tryfan Undertaking to carry dressed slate to Dinas Junction on the LNWR.  It has also previously been named both "Snowdon" and "South Snowdon".

"Rhyd Ddu" is Welsh for "Black Ford".

A station for Snowdon 
In the late 1880s, the construction of a railway up Snowdon from Llanberis was being seriously discussed. The NWNGR company renamed the station "Snowdon" as part of an effort to promote tourist traffic on their railway, especially amongst those who wanted to climb Wales' highest mountain. Some in Llanberis thought this misleading, but as contemporary literature pointed out -

Visitors were by now alighting at this halt in droves, and nearby Beddgelert consequently received many more visitors. Horse-drawn road vehicles provided the link to Beddgelert, the connections being included in the railway's timetable.  It was largely as a consequence of this that in 1893 a deputation of interested parties from Llanberis went to see landowner Mr Assheton-Smith, of the Vaenol Estate, who had previously been opposed to any railway up Snowdon, to try to convince him that Beddgelert was fast displacing Llanberis as the main centre for ascending the mountain. Assheton-Smith was ultimately convinced, and The Snowdon Mountain Tramroad and Hotels Co. Ltd. was established in November the following year.

Prior to the line's subsequent take-over by the Welsh Highland Railway, a report by Major Spring, commissioned by the Festiniog Railway, referred to "Rhyddu [sic] or Snowdon Station". After take-over, the line was extended southwards to Beddgelert and Porthmadog in 1923. The station name was first renamed to "South Snowdon" and renamed again in 1934 to Rhyd-Ddu.

Closure
Passenger services ceased to the old station site on 26 September 1936.

2003 re-opening
Following reconstruction, the section from Waunfawr to Rhyd Ddu was formally reopened by the Prince of Wales on 30 July 2003. Prince Charles travelled from Waunfawr to Snowdon Ranger in the replica of a North Wales Narrow Gauge Railways coach, and from there to Rhyd Ddu on the footplate of the Ffestiniog Railway locomotive "Prince", built in 1863, which hauled the special train.

Public passenger services commenced on 18 August 2003 and the station was reopened to passengers on 18 August 2003 on a new site slightly to the east (the car park occupies the original site) following the complete reconstruction of the railway from Waunfawr to Rhyd Ddu. An honoured guest that day was Mr Richard Williams of Beddgelert who had travelled on the first train in 1923.

Train services are now operated by the Festiniog Railway Company's Welsh Highland Railway subsidiary.

Facilities
Rhyd Ddu station is the starting point of the 'Rhyd Ddu' footpath to the summit of Snowdon.

There are public toilets and a car park adjoining the station. The Snowdonia Sherpa bus service to Beddgelert and Porthmadog or Pen-y-Pass calls at the station.

Welsh Highland Railway Phase 4 and 2006 reconstruction
Work on Phase 4, the long final section of the Welsh Highland Railway from Rhyd Ddu to Porthmadog, started at Rhyd Ddu in 2005.

In February and March, 2006, the station underwent a large extension to allow through running trains to Porthmadog. This included two water towers for trains running in both directions, a "Rhyd Ddu Yard" with two sidings, one capable of stabling a train, and building a new southerly extension to the platform that extends it to the 200 m standard length platform of this route. There is also a waiting shelter and occasional ticket office. Trackwork modifications were completed to permit right-hand running (normal WHR and FR practice) into and through the station. Unfortunately, for the 2006 reopening of the station on 8 April, the trackwork for the Up loop had not been consolidated sufficiently to allow carriages to use the Porthmadog bound platform, due to a mechanical failure of the tamper. For the period between the reopening and 1 June 2006, when right hand running commenced, temporary operating instructions were in place whilst trains continued to run into the left hand line.

Gallery

References

External links
 The Welsh Highland Railway Project - official reconstruction site
 Welsh Highland Railway (Caernarfon)
 Rebuilding The Welsh Highland Railway - an independent site
 The Royal re-opening to Rhyd Ddu 2003
 Welsh Highland Railway Timetables
 Multimap Map of Rhyd Ddu
 Video footage of Rhyd Ddu station

Heritage railway stations in Gwynedd
Welsh Highland Railway
Betws Garmon
Railway stations in Great Britain opened in 1881
Railway stations in Great Britain closed in 1936
Railway stations in Great Britain opened in 2003
1881 establishments in Wales